"I'm a Fool" is a song written by Tommy Smith and originally recorded by Slim Whitman.

Track listing

1967 version

Track listing

Charts

References 

1956 songs
1956 singles
Imperial Records singles
London Records singles
Slim Whitman songs